Dame Rosalind Mary Marsden  (born 1950) is a British diplomat and public servant. She was European Union Special Representative to Sudan from 2010 to 2013.  Dame Rosalind is a Patron of the charity Kids for Kids, helping children in Darfur, Sudan. She is currently an Associate Fellow in the Africa Programme at Chatham House.

She was educated at Woking County Grammar School for Girls, Somerville College, Oxford and St Antony's College, Oxford.

Background
 1974, Assistant Desk Officer at the Near East and North Africa Department
 1976-1980, Tokyo, the Second Secretary, Chancery (later promoted to First Secretary)
 1980-1983, FCO, policy planner
 1983-1985, European Community Department (Internal) Head of Section
 1985-1988, British Embassy, Bonn
 1989-1991, Deputy Head, Hong Kong Department 
 1991-1993, National Westminster Bank (Secondment) 
 1993-1996, Tokyo, Political Counsellor
 1996-1999, Head, United Nations Department
 1999-2003, Director, Asia-Pacific
 2003-2006, Kabul, Afghanistan as Her Majesty's Ambassador
 2006-2007, Basra, Iraq as British Consul-General
2007-2010, British Ambassador, Sudan
2010-2013, EU Special Representative for Sudan and South Sudan

In Kabul, she was a prominent supporter of the Afghan Woman's Hour, a women's radio programme for the BBC World Service Trust, to be broadcast on World Service Radio.

Honours
Dr Marsden was appointed DCMG in the New Year Honours 2010. She is also an Honorary Fellow, Somerville College, Oxford.

References

1950 births
Living people
Alumni of Somerville College, Oxford
Alumni of St Antony's College, Oxford
British civil servants
Ambassadors of the United Kingdom to Sudan
Dames Commander of the Order of St Michael and St George
British women ambassadors
Ambassadors of the United Kingdom to Afghanistan
Fellows of Somerville College, Oxford